Carlos Davis (born August 22, 1996) is an American football nose tackle who is a free agent. He played college football at Nebraska.

College career
Davis was an All-American in track and field at Nebraska in addition to football. He started 11 of 12 games as a defensive end as a senior and had 32 tackles. In his career, he compiled 125 total tackles, 18 tackles for a loss and nine and a half sacks.

Professional career

He ran a 4.82-second 40 yard dash at the combine, placing him in a tie for ninth among defensive linemen. Davis was selected in the seventh round of the 2020 NFL Draft with the 232nd overall pick by the Pittsburgh Steelers. He played 7 games during his rookie season of 2020, finishing with 6 tackles.

On October 27, 2021, Davis was placed on injured reserve. He was activated on December 4.

On August 30, 2022, Davis was waived by the Steelers and signed to the practice squad the next day.

Career statistic

Personal life
Davis is the twin brother of Khalil Davis. Khalil and Carlos were adopted by their parents Carl and Tracy Davis when they were 9 months old.

References

External links
Pittsburgh Steelers bio
Nebraska Cornhuskers bio

1996 births
Living people
Pittsburgh Steelers players
American football defensive tackles
Nebraska Cornhuskers football players
People from Blue Springs, Missouri
Players of American football from Missouri
Sportspeople from the Kansas City metropolitan area
Twin sportspeople
Nebraska Cornhuskers men's track and field athletes